The 1844 United States presidential election in Louisiana took place between November 1 and December 4, 1844, as part of the 1844 United States presidential election. Voters chose six representatives, or electors to the Electoral College, who voted for President and Vice President.

Louisiana voted for the Democratic candidate, James K. Polk, over Whig candidate Henry Clay. Polk won Louisiana by a narrow margin of 2.6%.

Results

See also
 United States presidential elections in Louisiana

References

Louisiana
1844
1844 Louisiana elections